Trevathana synthesysae is a species of coral barnacle in the family Pyrgomatidae.

References

External links

 

Barnacles